Jimmy Page by Jimmy Page is the title of a coffee table autobiography written by Led Zeppelin guitarist Jimmy Page. It is published by Genesis Publications and was published in September 2010.

The book include rare photos, personally selected by the author, along with handwritten captions describing the subject(s) in the images. The book is described as "a career in pictures". The selection of photos is meant to represent Page's musical career. The book was updated and re-released in 2014 to catch up on what happened since 2010.

Background 
At the time of publication the author was 66 years old. Only 2,500 copies of the book were published during its first run. All of these are personally signed by the author. The book is 512 pages, with more than 700 images printed on fine art paper.

References

Further reading 
 Page, Jimmy. Jimmy Page by Jimmy Page, Genesis Publications, 2010.

External links 
 

Music autobiographies
Jimmy Page
Coffee table books
Photographic collections and books
Genesis Publications books
2010 non-fiction books